Charles-Henri Tremblay (1919-1982) was a politician in Quebec, Canada.

Background

He was born on March 14, 1919, in Jonquière, Quebec (now Saguenay, Quebec). He was a technician with Hydro-Québec.

Political career

Tremblay successfully ran as a Parti Québécois candidate to the National Assembly of Quebec in the district of Sainte-Marie in the 1970 election.  He was defeated in the 1973 election by Liberal candidate Jean-Claude Malépart and in the district of Saint-Hyacinthe in the 1976 election by Union Nationale candidate Fabien Cordeau.

Death

He died on March 31, 1982.

Footnotes

1919 births
1982 deaths
Parti Québécois MNAs
Politicians from Saguenay, Quebec